John Scott Barker (born 3 July 1947) is a former Australian politician. He was born in Hobart, Tasmania. In 1987, he was elected to the Tasmanian House of Assembly representing Denison for the Liberal Party; he was elected in a countback following the resignation of Geoff Davis. He was Chairman of Committees 1992–95 and a minister 1995–96. Barker was defeated in 1996.

References

1947 births
Living people
Liberal Party of Australia members of the Parliament of Tasmania
Members of the Tasmanian House of Assembly